The Waionepu River is a river of the Northland Region of New Zealand's North Island. It flows generally west from its sources south of Maungatapere to reach the Waiotama River 20 kilometres southwest of Whangarei.

See also
List of rivers of New Zealand

References

Rivers of the Northland Region
Rivers of New Zealand
Kaipara Harbour catchment